Nothing Means Everything is the debut album from Scottish band The Dykeenies. It was released on the Lavolta Records label on 17 September 2007.

Track listing

2007 debut albums
The Dykeenies albums